Bugtussle and Bug Tussle may refer to a community in the United States:

Bug Tussle, Alabama (rural district)
Bugtussle, Kentucky (rural district)
Bugtussle, Oklahoma (unincorporated community)
 Bug Tussle, Texas (rural district)
 Bugtussle, the fictional hometown of the Clampett family in the CBS sitcom The Beverly Hillbillies